Charles Reynolds Brown (October 1, 1862 – November 28, 1950) was an American Congregational clergyman and educator, born in Bethany, W. Va.  He graduated at the University of Iowa in 1883 and studied theology in Boston University.  He lectured at various times at Leland Stanford, Yale, Cornell, and Columbia universities, and was pastor of the First Congregational Church at Oakland, Cal., from 1896 to 1911.  In the latter year he became dean of the Yale Divinity School.  He wrote:  
 Two Parables (1898)
 The Main Points (1899)
 The Social Message of the Modern Pulpit (1906)
 The Strange Ways of God, a Study of the Book of Job (1908)
 The Gospel of Good Health (1908)
 Faith and Health (1910)
 The Cap and Gown (1910)
 The Modern Man's Religion (1911)
 The Quest of Life and Other Addresses (1913)
 Living Again (Ingersoll Lecture, 1920)
  Lincoln The Greatest Man of the Nineteenth Century (1922)
 Ten Short Stories from the Bible (1925)
  My Own Yesterdays
  Being Made Over (1939)

Bibliography
 Scott Langston, "Exodus in Early Twentieth Century America: Charles Reynolds Brown and Lawrence Langner," in Michael Lieb, Emma Mason and Jonathan Roberts (eds), The Oxford Handbook of the Reception History of the Bible (Oxford, OUP, 2011), 433–446.

External links
 
 

 

Yale University faculty
American religious writers
People from Oakland, California
People from Bethany, West Virginia
University of Iowa alumni
American Congregationalist ministers
Congregationalist writers
American male non-fiction writers
1862 births
1950 deaths
Boston University School of Theology alumni